Hanna Erikson (born June 2, 1990) is a Swedish cross-country skier. She won three medals in the 2009 Junior World Championships.

Erikson, then competing as Hanna Brodin, was second in a World Cup sprint in Otepää in January 2011, only beaten by Slovenian Petra Majdič.

In December 2013, Hanna Erikson won the second stage of the 2013-14 Tour de Ski, a freestyle sprint in Oberhof. Later during that season, she qualified for the Swedish team at the Winter Olympics in Sochi.

Cross-country skiing results
All results are sourced from the International Ski Federation (FIS).

Olympic Games

World Championships

World Cup

Season standings

Individual podiums
 1 victory – (1 ) 
 3 podiums – (1 , 2 )

Team podiums
 1 victory – (1 ) 
 1 podium – (1 )

References

External links

1990 births
Living people
Olympic cross-country skiers of Sweden
Swedish female cross-country skiers
Tour de Ski skiers
Cross-country skiers at the 2014 Winter Olympics
Åsarna IK skiers
21st-century Swedish women